Sardi (also Romanized as Sardī; also known as Sarī) is a village in Salavat Rural District, Moradlu District, Meshgin Shahr County, Ardabil Province, Iran. At the 2006 census, its population was 57, in 12 families.

References 

Towns and villages in Meshgin Shahr County